Save Yourself is the fourth studio album by The Make-Up. It was originally released through K Records in 1999.

Critical reception
Justin Stranzl of Popmatters gave the album a 9 out of 10, saying, "Save Yourself is the best party you've ever attended, the best kiss you've ever had, and one of the hottest albums you'll ever hear."

NME named it the 14th best album of 1999.

Track listing

Personnel
Credits adapted from liner notes.

 Ian Svenonius – vocals
 James Canty – guitar, keyboards, percussion
 Michelle Mae – bass guitar, vocals
 Steve Gamboa – drums, percussion
 Brendan Canty – vibrachime (on "The Bells"), percussion, production, engineering
 Heather Worley – vocals (on "The Bells" and "Hey Joe")
 Ted Leo – guitar (on "C'Mon, Let's Spawn")
 Fred Erskine – trumpet (on "Call Me Mommy", "(Make Me a) Feelin' Man", and "C'Mon, Let's Spawn")
 John Golden – mastering
 Steve Raskin – graphic design
 Pat Graham – photography
 Garnett Soles – lettering

References

External links
 

1999 albums
The Make-Up albums
K Records albums
Au Go Go Records albums